Idioblasta lacteata is a moth in the family Crambidae. It was described by Warren in 1891. It is found on the  Marquesas Archipelago.

References

Crambinae
Moths described in 1891
Taxa named by William Warren (entomologist)